Camden Hawkins (born 6 December 1994) is a New Zealand cricketer. He made his first-class debut for Otago in the 2018–19 Plunket Shield season on 6 December 2018.

References

External links
 
 Camden Hawkins Otago Cricket Association profile

1994 births
Living people
New Zealand cricketers
Otago cricketers
Place of birth missing (living people)